Paul Cameron Rofe (born 16 January 1981, Adelaide, South Australia) is a former first-class cricketer who played for South Australia and Northamptonshire. A right-arm fast bowler, Rofe took 181 first-class wickets at an average of 29.66, with a best of 7/52. His limited overs career has been less successful, taking 37 wickets at 35.97. He made his first class debut in 2001 against Western Australia having previously represented Australia under-19s from 1999 until 2000.

External links

Australian cricketers
South Australia cricketers
People educated at Prince Alfred College
Living people
1981 births
Northamptonshire cricketers
Cricketers from Adelaide
Australian expatriate cricketers in the United Kingdom